"Rain on Me" is a song by American singers Lady Gaga and Ariana Grande, from Gaga's sixth studio album, Chromatica (2020). It was written by Gaga, Grande, Nija Charles, Rami Yacoub, Tchami, Boys Noize and its producers BloodPop and Burns. An upbeat house, dance-pop, electropop and disco song, the song features a synth-disco beat and funk guitars. Described by Gaga as a "celebration of tears", the track explores resilience in defiance of the hardships in life.

The track was released by Interscope Records as the album's second single on May 22, 2020. Music critics lauded the singers' vocals as well as the song's message. With the song's debut at the top of the Billboard Hot 100, it became Gaga's fifth and Grande's fourth number-one single in the US. It marked the first all-female collaboration to debut atop the chart, and made Grande the first artist to have four songs debut at the top spot. On Spotify, "Rain on Me" was the seventh most streamed song of summer 2020 and the most streamed song by a female artist globally during the season. Additionally, "Rain on Me" topped the charts in nine other countries, including Canada, Hungary and the United Kingdom.

The accompanying music video was directed by filmmaker Robert Rodriguez, and features Gaga and Grande dancing inside a giant arena during a rainstorm, with daggers falling from the sky. "Rain on Me" was nominated for seven MTV Video Music Awards, including Video of the Year, ultimately winning three awards, including Song of the Year. The duo gave a performance of "Rain on Me" at the VMA show, while Gaga performed the song solo on The Chromatica Ball tour (2022). "Rain on Me" was further promoted with the release of mock news broadcasts in partnership with The Weather Channel in which Gaga and Grande both appeared. The song won the Best Pop Duo/Group Performance category at the 63rd Grammy Awards, being the first female collaboration in history to win.

Background
The song was first mentioned in Gaga's March 2020 interview with Paper, when then unknown to be with Grande, was described as a "monster of a dance tune, but its message is about submitting yourself to devastation – a flawless dance floor crier as a "celebration of all the tears". Gaga disclosed that she had collaborated with a "fellow female pop star who [had similarly experienced] immense trauma while in the public eye" and went into depth about the genesis of their song: "I sat with her and we talked about our lives. It's two women having a conversation about how to keep going and how to be grateful for what you do."

In her May 21, 2020 interview with Zane Lowe on Apple Music's Beats 1, Gaga further talked about the writing process of the song:

Recording and composition
"Rain on Me" was written by Gaga, Grande, Burns, Nija Charles, Rami Yacoub, Bresso, Boys Noize and Chromatica executive producer BloodPop. Co-producer Burns explained that he wanted to create the "same energy" that songs like "Another Chance" by Roger Sanchez and "Music Sounds Better with You" by the French house group Stardust have, so that it can "feel classic but modern at the same time." Initially, the song was "a stark, solo acid-house demo", and Burns disclosed how the track changed significantly during their process:

"Rain on Me" is a house, dance-pop, and disco song, with electropop, French house, and Eurodance elements. It was composed using  common time in the key of C minor, with a tempo of 123 beats per minute. Most of the song follows a Cm7–Amaj9 sequence while the first verse and second pre-chorus adds a B(add4) and both pre-choruses include a Fm11 at the end. The track features an upbeat production consisting of synth-pop instrumentals, an R&B-influenced synth-disco beat, synth claps, funk guitar strums and rolling synths.

It opens with a stripped-down verse where Gaga's vocals are in the forefront. It is then accompanied by a French house bass and a thundering percussion. The mid-90s house-pop hook contains a pitched-down vocal loop. In the chorus, which is described as thundering, the beats build up, which then is altered into a techno beat drop. After doing ad-libs, Grande joins in the second verse, where handclapped beats are added. The final chorus "explodes" with the singers belting the song.

Gaga's and Grande's vocals, which were described as "booming", span from the low note of G3 to the high note of B5. Vocally, Gaga makes use of spoken word deliveries and Grande uses her "signature" high note octave. Described by Gaga as a "celebration of tears", the song uses the metaphor of rain for alcohol used to numb pain. Its first verse sees Gaga thinking about the hardships of life while Grande delivers lyrics about accepting reality in the second verse. According to Elle, the song is about "persevering through hardship, healing, and finding beauty in the pain, heartbreak, and life."

Release and promotion
"Rain on Me" was officially announced on April 22, 2020, when Gaga posted the tracklist of her Chromatica album. On May 15, 2020, both Gaga and Grande posted the single's cover art on Instagram and Twitter to announce its release a week later. It premiered as the album's second single on May 21, 2020, at 21:00 PT (4:00 UTC on May 22, 2020). The song was also promoted through an Amazon Music lyric video commercial. To coincide with the single release, rain-themed merchandise items were made available in Gaga's official online store, such as rainboots, poncho, and an umbrella. On May 27, 2020, a limited 7-inch vinyl with alternate artwork became available to ship on Lady Gaga's official web store.

On May 26, 2020, Gaga and Grande posted a one-minute skit in partnership with The Weather Channel, where they give a mock weather update while holding an umbrella, and talk about how they "would like to celebrate the rain". On May 28, 2020, they released another weather update, filmed in Gaga's pool and Grande's bathtub. "Rain on Me" was added to a list of songs played on Fortnite radio stations. On August 26, 2020, Gaga announced an online competition with a $10,000 cash grand prize for the winner, where participants had to design a poster inspired by "Rain on Me", using Adobe creative apps.

Critical reception

"Rain on Me" received widespread critical acclaim upon its release. Adam White of The Independent gave "Rain on Me" four out of five stars, expressing that the song was "three minutes of euphoric melodrama" and a "theatrical and replenishing triumph". Joey Nolfi of Entertainment Weekly wrote that "Rain on Me" is "taking fans to sonic heaven" with the "therapeutic banger". Mikale Wood from the Los Angeles Times called it "a fist-pumping self-empowerment jam". Althea Legapsi of Rolling Stone labelled the song  "rejuvenating", noting that the singers offer "a call-and-response exchange" as they "tout the rejuvenating aspects of the situation, despite the metaphorical bad weather sentiments." Dave Quinn from People highlighted "Grande touching her signature high note octaves" and "Gaga's bold voice" that "echos throughout the track as she sings, "Rain on Me" and "Hands up to the sky/I'll be your galaxy". Quinn Moreland of Pitchfork praised the song, writing that it "draws its power from two women connecting on an emotional level." In a rave review, Brenden Wetmore of Paper described the song as "absolutely electric by its end, having charged up enough raw emotion and heartbreak to power an entire circuit party's worth of strobe lights."

Craig Jenkins of Vulture complimented the singers' vocals and the beat, and thought that the song "will be huge", because "it has that nebulous quality memorable pop hits have where the lyric seems distinctly about one thing but also not about anything in particular." Hannah Mylrea from NME called it a "smash hit" that "may just be Gaga's best song since 2011's 'Born This Way"". Rania Aniftos from Billboard thought that "the song showcases both Ariana Grande and Lady Gaga's unmatched vocals". Billboard also named "Rain on Me" as the second best song off Gaga's Chromatica album, stating that "the incredible [...] production and uplifting songwriting help make the song great, but its the unmatched chemistry between the two pop divas that makes it one of Gaga's best." Chris DeVille of Stereogum called the song "epic", saying that "there is some genuine catharsis in there [...] when Gaga and Ariana Grande come together to persevere through trauma."

Matt Melis of Consequence wrote that "Gaga and Grande have vocal chops for miles", and called it a "dynamite feature". He also thought that "it's the release all of us have needed at least a couple dozen times during this pandemic", while highlighting its uplifting message: "No matter how bad the storm gets, we will endure and perhaps come out a little cleaner on the other side for the pain." Allison Stewart from The Washington Post called the song a "big-voiced superdiva summit" that is "engineered to be irresistible". Evan Sawdey from PopMatters named it "one of [Gaga's] all-time greatest singles", that "flies through its three-minute run time so quickly you barely realize it's about alcohol abuse". Alexa Camp of Slant Magazine was less enthusiastic, and while she opined that "Rain on Me" is "an improvement over previous single 'Stupid Love, she described the song as "two overzealous vocalists duking it out to see who can out-sing the other over the course of the track's three chart-maximizing minutes" and criticized the song's bridge.

Year-end lists
"Rain on Me" was considered one of the best songs of 2020 by many critics. Ben Beaumont-Thomas from The Guardian named "Rain on Me" as the best song of 2020, stating "it’s that sense of transcendence that makes it such a potent song in 2020, by acknowledging the rain and dancing through it". Billboard staff also named "Rain on Me" as the best song of the year, calling it a "stratospheric level of pop perfection" and stating "the song‘s true historical legacy will become clearer years from now when we look back on 2020, 'Rain on Me' stands apart as the song that helped millions of people cope with the uncertainty, tragedy and anxiety of an endless downpour of a year". Chris DeVille from Stereogum named "Rain on Me" as the best pop song of 2020, calling it an epic dance track that finds euphoria in resilience and stating "over a mammoth '90s-vintage house beat, Gaga and Grande channeled every ounce of their diva power, not quite erasing their trauma and struggle but vanquishing it for three minutes at a time". Helen Ainsley from Official Charts Company picked "Rain on Me" as her favourite song of 2020, stating "like a sudden downpour after a heatwave, 'Rain on Me' was an antidote to the drudge and uncertainty of the first few months of lockdown. This candid collab between two of pop’s most beloved powerhouses was a rousing reminder that while we may be struggling, at least we’re alive, packaged inside a dance-pop stomper that would have dominated clubs had they been open."

Commercial performance

"Rain on Me" debuted at number one on the Billboard Hot 100, becoming Gaga's fifth and Grande's fourth number one single as well as Gaga's seventeenth top 10 entry and Grande's sixteenth. It additionally became the first female-collaboration song to debut at number one on the chart. "Rain on Me" is Gaga's second song to debut at the top following "Born This Way", making her the fourth female artist to have two songs debut at number one, following Mariah Carey, Britney Spears, and Ariana Grande, and seventh overall, following Drake, Justin Bieber, and Travis Scott. Gaga is also the third artist following Carey and Beyoncé to accumulate a number one single in the 2000s, 2010s, and 2020s decades. Grande became the first artist to have four number one debut singles, surpassing Carey, Drake, and Bieber. Gaga also earns her eighth Digital Song Sales No. 1 and Grande adds her seventh. The song was driven by 31.5 million streams, 73,000 downloads and 11.1 million audience impressions in the week ending May 28, 2020. On March 17, 2021, "Rain on Me" was certified double platinum by the Recording Industry Association of America (RIAA) for moving 2 million units in the United States. The song's sales were aided by four physical/digital combination offerings during the tracking week; consumers could also purchase cassette, CD and vinyl singles, each with a digital download.

In the United Kingdom, "Rain on Me" debuted at number one on the UK Singles Chart becoming both Gaga and Grande's sixth UK number one single and Gaga's first single to debut atop. With this Gaga became the fourth female artist after Madonna, Kylie Minogue and Britney Spears, to have a number one single across three consecutive decades. Notching up 70,000 chart sales to seize the top spot from the previous week's leader, DaBaby's "Rockstar", "Rain on Me" claimed the biggest ever opening week streaming numbers by an all-female collaboration in the UK, with 8.1 million plays in seven days. At six number-one singles each, Gaga and Grande match Britney Spears and Rod Stewart with the tenth-most number-ones on the UK Singles Chart. With 515,000 chart sales during the three-month period, "Rain on Me" was the third best selling song of the summer 2020 in the UK, being the biggest song by a female artist in the country. "Rain on Me" was the seventeenth biggest song of 2020 in the UK, while also being the fourth biggest song by female artists in the country. It was the twelfth best selling and twentieth most streamed song of 2020 in the United Kingdom. As of July 2022, the song has sold 1.3 million copies and gained 153 million streams and has been certified double platinum by the British Phonographic Industry (BPI).

In Ireland, "Rain on Me" debuted atop the Irish Singles Chart, becoming Grande's sixth and Gaga's seventh number one single in the country. "Rain on Me" also scored the biggest opening week of 2020, surpassing the previous best set by Billie Eilish's "No Time to Die". "Rain on Me" is Gaga's first song to debut in pole position in over nine years since  "Born This Way" in 2011 and Grande's sixth to lead the top 50 in Ireland, and in doing so, she matched Rihanna as the female artists with the most number-ones of the past ten years. "Rain on Me" was the 20th biggest song of 2020 in Ireland, being the 5th biggest song by a female artist in the country. It was also the fastest-selling single of 2020.

In Canada, "Rain on Me" entered the Canadian Hot 100 chart at the top position on the issue dated June 6, 2020, becoming Gaga's sixth and Grande's fourth number one single in the country. It also debuted at number one on the Canadian Digital Songs Sales chart. In Australia, "Rain on Me" debuted at number two on the ARIA Singles Chart dated June 1, 2020, becoming Gaga's fourteenth and Grande's fifteenth top ten single in the country. For Grande, it is the second top 10 duet single to debut in that tier in three, following "Stuck with U". It remained at number two on its second week, still behind DaBaby's "Rockstar".

Music video

Background and production

The music video for "Rain on Me" was filmed in Los Angeles from February 20 to 24, 2020, shortly before the state of California went into lockdown due to the COVID-19 pandemic. The outfits worn by Gaga and Grande were designed by Laura Pulice and manufactured by Vex Clothing, a company specialized in latex suits. Pulice said that the inspiration for Gaga's look was "a futuristic sci-fi punk" and "a heavy metal album sex symbol", while for Grande they "wanted to keep with the style that she's comfortable with, while staying with the futuristic theme of the video." The singers' makeup was done by Sarah Tanno, who used products from Haus Laboratories and "wanted the looks to feel powerful, pop, with a mix of dangerous rebellion." The fashion of the video include lots of "dominatrix-esque" latex and PVC. Choreographer Richy Jackson aspired to develop choreography which was uplifting and easy to recreate for those who watch it. He added that he really enjoyed the process because he was "able to work with both Gaga and Ariana and design their dances based on their individual artistic personalities, unique likenesses and differences and also how they each sang their lyrics parts."

Prior to the release of the video, Gaga talked with Beats 1's Zane Lowe about working with Grande on the video, saying that "she was so open to trying things that she hasn't done before".  The music video was directed by filmmaker Robert Rodriguez, who had previously worked with Gaga on the films Machete Kills (2013) and Sin City: A Dame to Kill For (2014). It premiered on May 22, 2020, at 10 a.m. PT. On August 6, 2020, Gaga released the forty-eighth episode of her web series Gagavision, showing her and Grande going through rehearsals and filming the music video.

Synopsis and reception

The video starts with "Gaga lying on the ground in a pose similar to that on the Chromatica artwork with a dagger stuck in her thigh", which she later pulls out. Gaga appears in a pink outfit and platform boots, leading a troupe of dancers also dressed in pink as in her previous video for "Stupid Love", while Grande wears a purple outift and a "shiny black metallic miniskirt with butterfly wings", with her respective group of dancers also in purple. They are all dancing inside a giant arena during a rainstorm, with daggers falling from the sky. At one point in the clip, Gaga sports Grande's "trademark high pony" hairstyle, with Grande having her hair down. The video also features "some dramatic close-ups of Gaga with rain pouring down her face" behind a pane of glass, and a scene where the two singers are holding hands, "each with lengthy Sailor Moon hair floating in the wind behind them". The video ends with a shot of the two singers hugging each other.

Amy Mackelden of Harper's Bazaar thought the music video "is nothing short of iconic", and "features dramatic costume changes, and killer dance moves". Erin Vanderhoof of Vanity Fair called it a "lavishly produced and animated video" with "TikTok–friendly" dance moves, and found it "a bit of nostalgia to [...] the pre-coronavirus days". Kyle Munzenrieder of W magazine also noted that the choreography would translate well to TikTok videos as "the singers mostly stay static in place and pull the kind of moves one could easily record themselves doing in their bedroom". Stefanee Wang of Nylon complimented the performance of Gaga and Grande in the video, saying that "neither of them miss a single beat". She added that the visual for the song "makes a convincing case that, when the world falls, society should really just become a huge dance party. Brendan Wetmore of Paper found the video "equally as sparkly" as the single, "putting the two '10s dance-pop icons alongside each other for a riot in the rain." Critics found inspirations in the video from Blade Runner, Mortal Kombat and Bayonetta. The music video garnered 12 million views in its first 11 hours.

Live performances
On August 30, 2020, the duo performed the song at the 2020 MTV Video Music Awards, marking its first live performance. The track was part of a medley of songs from Chromatica. After performing "911", Gaga changed into a purple outift with a spiky shoulder-piece and started singing "Rain on Me". Grande joined her on stage, sporting long pigtails and high, white platform shoes. Accompanied by dancers, they performed the choreography as seen in the music video of the song, which included their synchronized jumping. Joey Nolfi from Entertainment Weekly called the performance "epic", as "the two singers hit high notes and performed exuberant choreography, wearing futuristic masks the entire time."

In 2022, Gaga performed "Rain on Me" at The Chromatica Ball stadium tour. Similarly to the music video, she starts singing the song flat on her back. The show in Los Angeles – which was recorded for an unknown project – involved fireworks exploding over Dodger Stadium during the closing part of "Rain on Me".

Remixes

On July 17, 2021, remixes of "Rain on Me" done by Ralphi Rosario and Purple Disco Machine were released digitally. On August 9, 2021, Venezuelan producer Arca announced via Discord that she produced her own remix of the song for Gaga's third remix album Dawn of Chromatica (2021). Her rendition samples the songs "Time" and "Mequetrefe" off her fourth studio album Kick I (2020), as well as the Changa tuki track "Mételo Sácalo" by DJ Yirvin.

In a review of Dawn of Chromatica, Slant Magazine Alexa Camp praised Arca's remix of the track, claiming that "it offers a glimpse of what Chromatica might have sounded like had Gaga's music lived up to the avant-garde pop image she's created for herself." It also earned the praise of Pitchfork Jamieson Cox as well, who thought it was Dawn of Chromatica's "most radical cut" that "situate[s] Gaga and Ariana Grande within Kick I gossamer avant-pop." Writing for Clash, Robin Murray thought that Arca's "mosaic-like approach" to the deconstruction of the song has "a sly, subversive edge." Sam Murphy of Junkee opined that Arca's remix "emerges from a sonic sludge, slowly revealing the song's euphoria bit-by-bit. The euphoria is harder to access but by the time it builds to its climax, through glitchy synths and chopped vocals, the pay-off is glorious." Alex Rigotti from Gigwise appreciated the producer's risk-taking in the remix, saying that "Arca lets the track simmer and steam, never letting up", and opined that "the decision to make all of 'Rain on Me' high-strung and tense with no resolution was certainly a big choice". She however added that she "respect[s] the intentions more than the product", saying that this remix is not one she "personally would come back to a lot".

Accolades
{| class="wikitable plainrowheaders"
|-
! Year
! Organization
! Award
! Result
! Ref.
|-
! rowspan="21" scope="row"| 2020
| rowspan="2"| American Music Awards
| Collaboration of the Year
| 
| rowspan="2" style="text-align:center;"| 
|-
| Favorite Music Video
| 
|-
| LOS40 Music Awards
| Best International Video
| 
| style="text-align:center;"| 
|-
| rowspan="3"| MTV Europe Music Awards
| Best Video
| 
| rowspan="3" style="text-align:center;"| 
|-
| Best Song
| 
|-
| Best Collaboration
| 
|-
| rowspan="2"| MTV Millennial Awards Brazil
| Global Hit
| 
| rowspan="2" style="text-align:center;"| 
|-
| International Collaboration
| 
|-
| rowspan="7"| MTV Video Music Awards
| Video of the Year
| 
| rowspan="7" style="text-align:center;"| 
|-
| Song of the Year
| 
|-
| Best Collaboration
| 
|-
| Best Pop
| 
|-
| Best Cinematography
| 
|-
| Best Visual Effects
| 
|-
| Best Choreography
| 
|-
| MTV Video Play Awards
| Most Played Music Videos
| 
| style="text-align:center;"| 
|-
| rowspan="2"| NRJ Music Awards
| International Collaboration of the Year
| 
| rowspan="2" style="text-align:center;"| 
|-
| Music Video of the Year
| 
|-
| rowspan="3"| People's Choice Awards
| Song of 2020
| 
| rowspan="3" style="text-align:center;"|  
|-
| Collaboration of 2020
| 
|-
| Music Video of 2020
| 
|-
! rowspan="12" scope="row"| 2021
| Billboard Music Awards
| Top Dance/Electronic Song
| 
| style="text-align:center;"| 
|-
| BMI Pop Awards
| Most-Performed Songs of the Year
| 
| style="text-align:center;"| 
|-
| Grammy Awards
| Best Pop Duo/Group Performance
| 
| style="text-align:center;"| 
|-
| rowspan="3"| iHeartRadio Music Awards
| Dance Song of the Year
| 
| rowspan="3" style="text-align:center;"| 
|-
| Best Music Video
| 
|-
| Favorite Music Video Choreography
| 
|-
| MYX Music Awards
| Favorite International Video
| 
| style="text-align:center;"| 
|-
| Nickelodeon Kids' Choice Awards
| Favorite Music Collaboration
| 
| style="text-align:center;"| 
|-
| Queerties Awards
| Anthem
| 
| style="text-align:center;"| 
|-
| Rockbjörnen
| Foreign Song of the Year
| 
| style="text-align:center;"| 
|-
| RTHK International Pop Poll Awards
| Top Ten International Gold Songs
| 
| style="text-align:center;"| 
|-

Track listing and formats

7"/cassette/CD/picture disc
 "Rain on Me" – 3:02
 "Rain on Me" (instrumental) – 3:02

Digital download and streaming (Single version)

 "Rain on Me" – 3:02
Digital download (Instrumental)
 "Rain on Me" (instrumental) – 3:02

Digital download and streaming (Purple Disco Machine remix)
 "Rain on Me" (Purple Disco Machine remix – edit) – 3:58
 "Rain on Me" (Purple Disco Machine remix) – 6:34

Digital download and streaming (Ralphi Rosario remix)
 "Rain on Me" (Ralph Rosario remix – edit) – 3:58
 "Rain on Me" (Ralph Rosario remix) – 7:31

Credits and personnel 
Credits adapted from the liner notes of Chromatica.

Recording locations 
 Recorded at Conway Recording Studios (Hollywood, California), MXM Studios (Los Angeles, California), and Henson Recording Studios (Los Angeles, California)
 Mastered at Sterling Sound Studios (New York City)

Personnel 

 Lady Gaga – vocals, songwriter
 Ariana Grande – vocals, songwriter
 BloodPop – producer, songwriter
 Burns – producer, songwriter, bass, drum, guitar, keyboards
 Tchami – additional producer, songwriter
 Alexander Ridha – songwriter
 Nija Charles – songwriter
 Rami Yacoub – songwriter
 Leddie Garcia – percussion
 Rachel Mazer – saxophone
 Benjamin Rice – vocal producer, recording engineer, mixer
 Tom Norris – mixer
 E. Scott Kelly – assistant mixer
 Randy Merrill – mastering engineer

Charts

Weekly charts

Monthly charts

Year-end charts

Certifications

Release history

See also 

 List of Billboard Hot 100 number-one singles of 2020
 List of Billboard Hot 100 top-ten singles in 2020
 List of Billboard Digital Song Sales number ones of 2020
 List of Billboard Hot 100 chart achievements and milestones
 List of Canadian Hot 100 number-one singles of 2020
 List of number-one digital songs of 2020 (Canada)
 List of UK Singles Chart number ones of the 2020s
 List of UK Singles Downloads Chart number ones of the 2020s
 List of UK top-ten singles in 2020
 List of number one singles in Scotland (2020)
 List of number-one singles of 2020 (Ireland)
 List of number-one songs of 2020 (Singapore)
 List of airplay number-one hits in Argentina

References

2020 singles
2020 songs
American dance-pop songs
Ariana Grande songs
Billboard Hot 100 number-one singles
Canadian Hot 100 number-one singles
Grammy Award for Best Pop Duo/Group Performance
Interscope Records singles
Irish Singles Chart number-one singles
Lady Gaga songs
Number-one singles in Greece
Number-one singles in Israel
Number-one singles in Singapore
Song recordings produced by BloodPop
Songs written by Lady Gaga
Songs written by BloodPop
Songs written by Ariana Grande
Songs written by Burns (musician)
Songs written by Nija Charles
Songs written by Rami Yacoub
Songs written by Tchami
Songs written by Boys Noize
UK Singles Chart number-one singles
Female vocal duets
Songs about alcohol
Songs about weather
American house music songs
Electropop songs
American disco songs